Jesper Møller may refer to:
 Jesper Møller (animator)
 Jesper Møller (mathematician)
 Jesper Møller (DBU)